Milton Viorst (February 18, 1930 – December 9, 2022) was an American journalist who wrote and reported on the Middle East, writing in a series of publications, most notably The New Yorker. He wrote ten books over the course of his career.

Education
Viorst studied history at Rutgers University. In 1951, he was a Fulbright scholar in France. He returned and attended Harvard University and Columbia University, where he graduated in 1956 in journalism.

Career
From 1956 to 1993, Viorst often contributed in various ways to publications such as The New Yorker, Foreign Affairs, Harper's Magazine, The Atlantic, The New York Times Magazine, the New York Post, The Washington Post, and The Wall Street Journal. In 1968, he signed the "Writers and Editors War Tax Protest" pledge, vowing to refuse tax payments in protest against the Vietnam War. His writing landed him on the master list of Nixon political opponents.

Milton Viorst won an Alicia Patterson Journalism Fellowship in 1979 to research and write about Zionist and Islamic ideas and the Mideast crisis. In the early 1980s, he grew interested in Middle Eastern policy and became a specialist in this field. He is the author of six books on the subject, including In the Shadow of The Prophet.

On October 5, 1988, Viorst wrote an op-ed in The Washington Post erroneously dispersing doubt over whether Saddam Hussein's regime had used chemical weapons in a genocide of Iraq's Kurdish population. Despite confirmation from Secretary of State George Shultz, a month earlier, that poison gas had been employed to kill thousands of civilians, including children, Viorst maintained that it "may never have taken place" and argued for Congress not to pass the Prevention of Genocide Act, which later failed. The campaign of extermination against the Kurds made for up to 100,000 casualties. Viorst is criticized for his misleading article in A Problem from Hell.

In April 2016, Viorst published Zionism: The Birth and Transformation of an Ideal with St. Martin's Press.

Personal life
Viorst was married to the children's author Judith Viorst, known for Alexander and the Terrible, Horrible, No Good, Very Bad Day. They had three sons. He had earlier been briefly married to novelist Marion Meade.

He died from complications of COVID-19 at a hospital in Washington, D.C., on December 9, 2022, at the age of 92.

References

External links
Milton Viorst biography via Alliance Française USA
Milton Viorst on ‘The Israel Lobby’

1930 births
2022 deaths
Rutgers University alumni
Harvard University alumni
Columbia University Graduate School of Journalism alumni
American male journalists
American tax resisters
Writers from Paterson, New Jersey
20th-century American journalists
Deaths from the COVID-19 pandemic in Washington, D.C.